Prasun Banerjee is a retired international footballer and an Arjuna Award Winner (1979) from Kolkata, India. Younger brother of the Pradip Kumar Banerjee, Prasun had also captained the India national football team in international tournaments.

Playing career
He was vice-captain of the India U-20 team that clinched 1974 AFC Youth Championship title in Thailand.

Banerjee began his club football career with Calcutta Football League club Kidderpore. He was included in the All Time Best-XI team of Mohun Bagan as a central defensive midfielder. He was only the second Indian to play for Asian All-star XI. He also played two matches against Brazil for Asian All-star XI and played against Zico, Eder, Falcao, Socretes and others. He was included in the Limca book of record for representing India in 100 football matches.

In 2013, he won the bypoll to the Howrah Sadar parliamentary constituency on a Trinamool Congress ticket thus becoming the first professional footballer to be a Member of Parliament, India (Lok Sabha). He won the seat defeating his adversary, Left Front's Sridip Bhattacharya, by more than 27,000 votes. He was re-elected to the 16th Lok Sabha in 2014.

Early life 
Prasun is the younger brother of India's player of the 20th century and former national coach, P. K. Banerjee. He is a graduate of the University of Calcutta.

Career statistics

India national team

Debut: 26 July 1974 vs Malaysia, in Merdeka Cup at Kuala Lumpur (Prasun Banerjee came in as a substitute for Gautam Sarkar).
No of Matches Played – 49
No of Matches played as a Captain – 5
Goals Scored – 3

International tournaments

Asian Games – 1974, 1978, 1982.
Merdeka Cup (Kuala Lumpur) – 1974, 1981, 1982.
Pre Olympics – 1980 (Captain).
Nehru Cup – 1982.
Kings Cup (Bangkok) – 1977, 1981.
Presidents Cup (Seoul) – 1982.
Aga Khan Gold Cup (Dhaka) – 1977.

Other Achievements

Prasun Banerjee was the Joint Captain of the Indian Youth Team along with Sabbir Ali which became Joint Champions with Iran in Asian Youth Soccer Tournament at Bangkok.

Bengal

Santosh Trophy – 1974, 1975, 1976, 1977, 1978, 1979 (Captain), 1982.
Goals Scored – 3
Championships Won – 1975, 1976, 1977, 1978, 1979 (Captain) and 1982 (Joint) – 6 times

Clubs

 Mohun Bagan – 1974, 1975, 1976, 1977, 1978 (Captain), 1979, 1980, 1982, 1983.
Goals Scored – 24 goals (CFL – 14, Bordoloi Trophy – 4, IFA Shield – 1, Durand Cup – 1, Rovers Cup – 1, Federation Cup −2, Darjeeling Gold Cup – 1).
 
Trophies Won -

Calcutta Football League (4) – 1976, 1978, 1979, 1983.
IFA Shield (5) – 1976 (Joint), 1977, 1978 (Joint), 1979, 1982.
Durand Cup (5) – 1974, 1977, 1979, 1980, 1982 (Joint).
Rovers Cup (2) – 1976, 1977.
Federation Cup (3) – 1978 (Joint), 1980 (Joint), 1982.
Bordoloi Trophy (4) – 1974, 1975, 1976, 1977.
Darjeeling Gold Cup (4) – 1975, 1976 (Joint), 1979, 1982.
Nagjee Trophy (1) – 1978.

Total – 28.

 Mohammedan Sporting – 1981, 1984, 1985
 
Goals Scored – 4 (CFL – 1, Federation Cup – 2, Sanjay Gandhi Gold Cup – 1).
 
Trophies Won -

Calcutta Football League – 1981.
Federation Cup – 1984.
Sanjay Gandhi Gold Cup – 1981.
Stafford Cup – 1981 (Joint).
Nizam Gold Cup – 1984.
Nagjee Trophy – 1984.
Rovers Cup – 1984.
Darjeeling Gold Cup – 1984.
Bordoloi Trophy – 1985

Total – 9

Coaching

Prasun Banerjee has also coached Mohun Bagan for two months in the 1990–91 season.

Honours

India
King's Cup third place: 1977

India U20
 AFC Asian U-19 Championship: 1974

Individual
Arjuna Award: 1979
Shaan-e-Mohammedan: 2016

References

Indian footballers
India international footballers
Footballers from Kolkata
Aryan FC players
1955 births
Living people
India MPs 2009–2014
Trinamool Congress politicians from West Bengal
Lok Sabha members from West Bengal
India MPs 2014–2019
University of Calcutta alumni
Footballers at the 1974 Asian Games
Footballers at the 1978 Asian Games
Footballers at the 1982 Asian Games
Indian sportsperson-politicians
Politicians from Kolkata
People from Howrah district
Association football midfielders
Asian Games competitors for India
Mohun Bagan AC players
Mohammedan SC (Kolkata) players
India MPs 2019–present
Recipients of the Arjuna Award
Mohun Bagan AC managers
Indian football managers